Casa Bonita (Spanish for "pretty house") is a Mexican restaurant in Lakewood, Colorado, at the JCRS (Jewish Consumptives' Relief Society) Shopping Center, now known as the Lamar Station Plaza.

Opened in 1974, it was originally part of a chain of Mexican-themed entertainment restaurants that started in Oklahoma City. The building is currently undergoing renovations with a tentative reopening in May 2023. Casa Bonita's new owners, South Park creators Trey Parker and Matt Stone, asked a judge to help them keep some documents, like permit applications and building plans, from being released to the public.

Per The Denver Post, the restaurant's "pink exterior conceals a vast network of nooks and crannies inside. While the main, multilevel dining room is decorated with plastic palm trees and strings of lights, different facades and themed rooms invoke regional Mexican architectural styles, including the resort of Puerto Vallarta." The centerpiece is a 30-foot indoor waterfall with cliff divers, an imitation of the cliffs of Acapulco. The building is crowned with a gold dome and a statue of Cuauhtémoc, the last Aztec emperor of Mexico. It was designated a  historic landmark of the city in March 2015. It has billed itself as "The World's Most Exciting Restaurant."

History
Founder Bill Waugh opened the first Casa Bonita restaurant in Oklahoma City, Oklahoma, in 1968. By the mid-1970s, the chain had expanded to locations in adjacent states and was known for its "all you can eat" beef or chicken plates and offering sopapillas—small squares of fried bread served with honey—with every meal.

In 1982, the company (including Taco Bueno fast food restaurants) was sold to Unigate (now Uniq plc). In 1992, Unigate sold the restaurants to CKE Restaurants, owners of Carl's Jr. In 1997, the two remaining Casa Bonita restaurants were spun off by CKE as part of Star Buffet. The Tulsa location closed in September 2005, then reopened for a 2-year run under the name Casa Viva, and went out of business in December 2007.  Casa Bonita was reopened by Star Buffet under the original name in late July 2008. In March 2015, it was announced that the Lakewood Historical Society decided to make the restaurant a historic landmark of the city.

On April 6, 2021, Casa Bonita filed for Chapter 11 bankruptcy in the United States Bankruptcy Court for the District of Arizona. In an August 2021 interview with Colorado Governor Jared Polis, South Park creators Trey Parker and Matt Stone announced that they had struck a deal to purchase the restaurant. On September 23, Parker, Stone, Casa Bonita Inc., and The Beautiful House LLC (company related to Parker and Stone), struck a sale agreement for $3.1 million, making Summit Family Restaurants lose the bid at the same time. Judge Michael E. Romero of the U.S. Bankruptcy Court still had to sign the deal. A group named Save Casa Bonita filed an objection to Parker and Stone's sale agreement, because they put a sale offer first, making it up to the court. The objection to the sale was later withdrawn. On November 4, the sale agreement was officially signed by the judge. On November 17, they hired their first employee, Chef Dana Rodriguez. They officially owned the restaurant as of November 19. On December 22, 2022, Stone and Parker announced the restaurant would be reopening in May 2023.

Locations

Oklahoma City, Oklahoma
The first Casa Bonita was opened in the summer of 1968 in Oklahoma City, at a time when Mexican food was considered a novelty in the area. The restaurant was located along U.S. Route 66 at the intersection of NW 39th and Portland. On opening, it featured themed rooms, including the Garden Room and El Pokey, a room themed as a Mexican jail.  The Oklahoma City location closed in 1993. After housing other businesses, the building was demolished in 2015.

Tulsa, Oklahoma
The Tulsa location opened in 1971 near the intersection of 21st and Sheridan. The interior was designed to create the outdoor nighttime atmosphere of a Mexican village.  Its various themed dining areas, with seating for over 500, included a village square with fountain, a 2-level lantern-lit cave, a tropical garden with 20-ft waterfall and stream, and a room resembling an aristocratic dining hall with a porch along with strolling mariachis. The Tulsa location also included a puppet and magic show theater, a video arcade, a working carousel, and a gift shop.

It closed on September 30, 2005, due to a reported inability to reach suitable lease terms with the property owner. It was reopened, as Casa Viva, in May 2006 and then closed again in December 2007.  In late July 2008, the restaurant, having been sold back to its previous owner group, reopened under the original Casa Bonita name. In February 2011, the restaurant failed to reopen after lengthy snowstorms hit Tulsa, and a sign on the door said it was closed for business.

Little Rock, Arkansas 
The Little Rock location opened in 1969 at the corner of University Avenue and Asher Avenue (at the time U.S. Highway 67/70), just south of the University of Arkansas-Little Rock campus. This location had many of the same features as its sister locations including a Garden Room, an El Pokey (a room themed as a Mexican jail), a fully functioning video arcade, and a gift shop. In its heyday, the Little Rock location was reported to have been the highest volume Mexican restaurant in the United States with annual sales of up to $2,500,000. That distinction would later go to the Denver location which would go on to post nearly $8,000,000 in sales on an annual basis.

The restaurant closed and rebranded under the ownership of the Waugh family as "Casa Viva" on August 2, 1993, after a reported $250,000 was spent in renovations. It would revert to the original Casa Bonita branding in 1995, until closing permanently in 2005.

Lakewood, Colorado

The Lakewood location was built in 1973 and opened in early 1974 on Colfax Avenue west of Denver, along U.S. Route 40/I-70 Business. Similar in architecture to the Tulsa location (both were previously large retail store locations) features strolling mariachis, flame jugglers (no longer allowed in 2019 for violating fire code), and a  waterfall with cliff divers. The website Roadside America mentions that the restaurant has "Wild West shootouts, brawling pirates, [and] a dancing gorilla" that "can be viewed while you eat." It also has a small puppet theater, a "haunted tunnel" called Black Bart's Cave, an arcade with a large skee-ball room, and a magic theater. The restaurant is 52,000 square feet and can seat up to 1,100 patrons.

COVID-related financial problems
In March 2020, the Lakewood location closed temporarily due to the COVID-19 pandemic, during which Colorado Governor Jared Polis stopped in-person dining for a two-month span from March 17 to May 26. In March, several employees reported that their most recent paychecks had bounced due to insufficient funds in the payroll account of Casa Bonita. The restaurant's website disappeared during the summer of 2020 sometime between July 7 and July 30.

Former locations
Hulen Mall, Fort Worth, Texas (1982–1985)
Little Rock, Arkansas (1969–1993) (1995–2005)

Similar restaurants 
Casa Bonita founder Bill Waugh founded a similar restaurant concept, Casa Viva. Unrelated to the Florida fast-food chain of the same name, it operated in the former Casa Bonita locations in Little Rock (1995–2005) and Tulsa (2006–2007).
Larry H. Miller, owner of the Utah Jazz, opened a restaurant called The Mayan Adventure (usually just shortened to The Mayan) in Sandy, Utah, in 2000.  Casa Bonita sued Miller for trademark infringement; Miller was found to have visited Casa Bonita several times. The Mayan Adventure eventually closed in late 2011.
Restaurante Arroyo, in Tlalpan, Mexico, a "super-size" Mexican restaurant.

In popular culture
The South Park episode "Casa Bonita" prominently features the Colorado branch of the restaurant. Other episodes that mention it briefly are: "Quest for Ratings" (where a clock is labeled as showing the time at Casa Bonita), "You Have 0 Friends", "201" (where the restaurant is reportedly destroyed), and "Let Go, Let Gov". Additionally, the building that houses South Park Studios was named after the restaurant. In August 2021, the show's creators, Trey Parker and Matt Stone, announced that they had struck a deal to purchase Casa Bonita. In South Park: The Fractured But Whole, as part of the DLC, the main story is focused on the building. The South Park connection comes about as the creators of the show and several staff of South Park recalled having fond memories frequenting the establishment as children in the Denver suburbs.

In 2009, rock band The Fray held the release party for their eponymous second album at Casa Bonita. 

In Eureka, a reference to "Casa Bonita" is made, where an "artificial intelligent" love-struck Andy, who is the deputy of the town Sheriff in the new alternate timeline, regards the sheriff's "artificial intelligent" house S.A.R.A.H. as his "Casa Bonita" when stuck on Titan (Saturn's moon) by an accidental journey using the series' fictional "faster-than-light" technology.

In the reboot of Roseanne, Casa Bonita is featured as the workplace of Becky Connor in Episode 4.

The music video for Collapsing Scenery's "Resort Beyond the Last Resort", directed by Kansas Bowling and starring Boyd Rice, was partially filmed at Casa Bonita.

Punk rock band SPELLS performed their song "A Huevo" at Casa Bonita.

In 2018, the Denver Broncos announced their draft picks at Casa Bonita with the help of the resident magician.

For several years, artist Andrew Novick has hosted a Casa Bonita-themed art show at Denver's NEXT Gallery. Novick has been to the restaurant more than 300 times and has given tours of it. He says of the restaurant, "every time I go there, I have a sense of wonder all over again because it's so big and there's so many things in there—like the waterfall—and you feel like you're outside, and the sounds and lights and everything in there. It's just ... it's unmatched."

References

External links

Restaurants established in 1968
Mexican restaurants in the United States
Theme restaurants
Restaurants in Colorado
Restaurants in Oklahoma
Tourist attractions in Jefferson County, Colorado
Economy of Lakewood, Colorado
Defunct restaurant chains in the United States
1968 establishments in Oklahoma
Companies that filed for Chapter 11 bankruptcy in 2021
South Park
2021 mergers and acquisitions
Colorado culture